Soha Abed Elaal (born June 19, 1973) is an athlete from Egypt who competes in archery.

At the 2008 Summer Olympics in Beijing Abed Elaal finished her ranking round with a total of 587 points. This gave her the 57th seed for the final competition bracket in which she faced Naomi Folkard in the first round. The archer from Great Britain was too strong and eliminated Abed Elaal straight away with a 107–95 score.

References

1973 births
Living people
Olympic archers of Egypt
Archers at the 2008 Summer Olympics
Egyptian female archers
21st-century Egyptian women